CBC News Network (formerly CBC Newsworld) is a Canadian English-language specialty news channel owned by the Canadian Broadcasting Corporation (CBC). It broadcasts into over 10 million homes in Canada. As Canada's first all-news channel, it is the world's third-oldest television service of this nature, after CNN in the United States and Sky News in the United Kingdom.

It is funded by cable subscriber fees and commercial advertising. Unlike the CBC's main television network, the channel cannot directly receive operational funds from the corporation's public funding allotment—although it does benefit from synergies with other CBC services, such as the ability to share reporters and programs with the main network.

CBC News Network's French-language counterpart is Ici RDI, also owned by the CBC (or, Société Radio-Canada in French).

Revenue

According to the 2014 "Communications Monitoring Report" by the Canadian Radio-television and Telecommunications Commission (CRTC), CBC News Network in 2014 had 11.3 million subscribers and a revenue of $86.7 million.

History
With CNN already being widely available in Canada during the 1980s, private and state-owned Canadian broadcasters began to apply for a licence for a similar 24-hour news service in Canada. In 1987, the Canadian Radio-television and Telecommunications Commission (CRTC) awarded a licence to the CBC.

The launch of CBC's 24-hour news service was delayed several times: first when Allarcom, who had filed a competing application for an all-news channel, chose to appeal the CRTC decision; second, when the federal cabinet issued a directive to the CBC to revise its service plan for the network to include private commercial broadcasters and to launch a parallel French language service; and lastly, when cable companies were reluctant to add the service just five months after a similar launch of numerous other channels.

CBC Newsworld finally began broadcasting on 31 July 1989 from several regional studios in Halifax, Toronto, Winnipeg and Calgary, becoming Canada's first all-news channel. (As of 2017, there are production studios in Vancouver, Toronto and Halifax.)

In the 1990s, the channel also aired repeats of CBC Television's political sketch comedy series This Hour Has 22 Minutes and Royal Canadian Air Farce, but these were discontinued in 2001 after a CRTC directive that the shows did not qualify as news programming.

In 2000, because of a fee dispute between Persona (then known as Regional Cablesystems; later acquired by Eastlink) and the CBC, CBC News Network was dropped by a number of Persona-owned cable systems. Thereafter, while CBC News Network was sometimes thought to be a mandatory basic cable channel, these cable systems did not carry the channel at all during much of the 2000s.

Newsworld International

Some of CBC News Network's programming also aired on the now-defunct Newsworld International, an American cable news network co-owned by the CBC and the Power Corporation of Canada. CBC Newsworld (as it was then known) produced some programming for Newsworld International, and scheduled programming from other news networks like Britain's BBC World, which did not air on the Canadian channel.

Soon after, Newsworld International was sold to USA Networks in 2000, then to Vivendi Universal Entertainment in 2001, and then to Al Gore and Joel Hyatt in 2004. Newsworld continued to provide the network's programming until Gore and Hyatt launched their own network, Current TV, on 1 August 2005. In 2013, the channel was sold again to the Al Jazeera Media Network and became Al Jazeera America on 20 August 2013.

2009 re-launch
In December 2008, it was reported that the CBC planned to revamp Newsworld in 2009, as the result of a strategic review and market survey. The CBC found that consumer awareness of CBC Newsworld was lower in comparison to other specialty channels, and there was a perception that the CBC broke stories too slowly. Tentative plans also called for the revamped channel to have more prominent displays of news headlines and weather reports.

On 21 October 2009, it was announced that CBC Newsworld would be renamed CBC News Network on October 26 as part of a larger re-launch of the CBC News division. A new lineup of programs was introduced to the network, with a greater emphasis towards live news coverage. New programs included CBC News Now (the channel's rolling news coverage), Power & Politics, The Lang and O'Leary Exchange (a business news program hosted by Amanda Lang and Dragons' Den-investor Kevin O'Leary), and Connect with Mark Kelley.

CBC News Network HD
In January 2009, the CBC launched an HD simulcast of CBC News Network (then CBC Newsworld) called CBC Newsworld HD. The channel was renamed CBC News Network HD on 26 October 2009 to coincide with the renaming of CBC Newsworld to CBC News Network. The HD feed has been confirmed at 720p resolution on Shaw Cable after it was added to the lineup in 2014. It is available through all major television providers in the country.

Programming
CBC News Network used to air a number of magazine-style programs, along with hourly news updates. The network has moved from that style of programming to focusing solely on live-news and documentary programs, including The Passionate Eye and Rough Cuts—both of which used to be hosted by Michaëlle Jean—and Politics—a political affairs program hosted by Don Newman that aired twice daily. The Hour with George Stroumboulopoulos was launched in 2005 in an attempt to attract younger viewers; similar news-oriented talk shows, such as Pamela Wallin Live, CounterSpin, Face Off, and Benmergui Live, also aired on the network in the 1990s.

The network's daytime schedule consists of live rolling news coverage (formerly branded as CBC News Now), which airs weekdays from 10:00a.m. to 4:00p.m. ET, Saturdays from 6:00a.m. to 5:30p.m. ET, and Sundays from 6:00a.m. to 4:00p.m. ET (with a two-hour break from 10:00a.m. to 12:00p.m. ET). Instead of producing a separate noon-hour program, most CBC Television stations simulcast CBC News Network from 12:00 to 1:00pm local time, with an "L-bar" showing local news and weather headlines.

Power & Politics airs live from 5:00 to 7:00p.m. ET. From 8:00 to 9:00p.m. on weekdays, CBC News Network airs Canada Tonight, hosted by Ginella Massa.

Beginning with the Atlantic Time Zone airing at 9:00p.m. ET, The National—CBC News' flagship nightly newscast—runs live until 2:00a.m. ET and then on a loop until 6:00 a.m. ET the following morning.

Other original programming that appear on CBC News Network includes:

 Marketplace — Canadian consumer watchdog series
 The Fifth Estate — investigative documentary newsmagazine series
 The Passionate Eye — documentary television series
 Rosemary Barton Live — live weekly program on political news and issues, hosted by CBC's chief political correspondent Rosemary Barton.
 The Investigators — hosted by Diana Swain

Since 2021, the channel has also simulcast CBC Radio One's news phone-in show Cross Country Checkup on Sunday afternoons.

Anchors

Current
 Peter Armstrong
 Adrienne Arsenault
 Rosemary Barton
 Andrew Chang
 Natasha Fatah
 Jennifer Hall
 Ian Hanomansing
 Heather Hiscox
 Colleen Jones
 Vassy Kapelos
 Carole MacNeil
 Ginella Massa
 Andrew Nichols
 Scott Peterson
 Aarti Pole
 Michael Serapio
 Hannah Thibedeau

Former
Original members of the first Newsworld anchor team:

George Boyd
Whit Fraser
Beth Gaines
Jane Gilbert
Paul Griffin

Other former anchors:
 Dave Brindle
 Kim Brunhuber — now with The National
 Bill Cameron — deceased (2005)
 Bruce Dowbiggin — 1990s
 Harry Forestell — now host of CBC News: New Brunswick
 Dawna Friesen — now with Global National
 Tom Harrington — current host of The World This Hour on CBC Radio One
 Michaëlle Jean — now former Governor General of Canada
 Mark Kelley
 Nil Köksal — now host of World Report, CBC News Toronto Weekend, and CBC Toronto News at 11 (Sunday)
 Amanda Lang — eponymous anchor of The Lang and O'Leary Exchange; now host of Bloomberg North on Bloomberg TV Canada
 Anne-Marie Mediwake — now CTV Morning Live
 Suhana Meharchand
 Jordi Morgan — official for the Canadian Federation of Independent Business and metro organiser for the Progressive Conservative Party of Nova Scotia
 Reshmi Nair
 Don Newman — retired
 John Northcott - now weekend anchor of World Report on CBC Radio One
 Anne Petrie
 Kathleen Petty — current host of Ottawa Morning on CBC Radio Ottawa
 Lorne Saxberg — died in snorkelling accident in Thailand
 Sarika Sehgal — moved to CTV News Channel; now deceased
 Alison Smith — now retired; former co-anchor of The World at Six on CBC Radio One with Bernie McNamee
 Evan Solomon — now host of Question Period on CTV News Channel
 George Stroumboulopoulos — now freelance
 Sheldon Turcott — retired; deceased as of 2000
 Nancy Wilson — retired

Logos

References

External links
 
 Newsworld on MBC

 
Television channels and stations established in 1989
1989 establishments in Canada
CBC News
State media   
24-hour television news channels in Canada
English-language television stations in Canada
Category C services
Canadian Broadcasting Corporation television networks